The Adnanites were a tribal confederation of the Ishmaelite Arabs, traces their lineage back to Ismail son of the Islamic prophet and patriarch Ibrahim and his wife Hajar through Adnan, who originate from the Hejaz. Their lineage from him could be further traced back up to prophets Nuh, the founder of the first ship on earth and Adam, the purported first man on earth. The Islamic prophet Muhammad belonged to the Quraysh tribe of the 'Adnanites'.

According to the Arab tradition, The Adnanites are the Northern Arabs, unlike the Qahtanite Arabs of southern Arabia, who are descended from Qahtan, son of the Islamic prophet Hūdʿ.

Yemeni genealogical tradition

According to both Arab and Yemeni genealogical tradition, the Adnanites are descended from Adnan whom in turn comes from the Islamic prophet Ismail. whereas the Yemeni tradition (except the Arab) believes in Qahtanites of Southern Arabia (South of Saudi Arabia and Northern Yemen) are the original, pure Arabs.

Modern historiography
According to modern historians, the traditional distinction between Adnanites and Qahtanites lacks evidence and may have developed out of the later faction-fighting during the Umayyad period.

Further reading
 The dwelling places and wanderings of the Arabian tribes, by Heinrich Ferdinand Wüstenfeld, in German
 Were the Qays and Yemen of the Umayyad Period Political Parties?

See also
 Prophet Muhammad, a member of this group

References

 
Ancient Arabic peoples
Arabization
Genealogy
Semitic-speaking peoples

Ishmaelites